Francesca Schiavone was the defending champion, but chose not to participate that year.

Pauline Parmentier won in the final 6–4, 6–4, against Lucie Hradecká.

Seeds

Draw

Finals

Top half

Bottom half

External links
Draw and Qualifying Draw

Singles
Gastein Ladies
Gast
Gast